Tenorlee is an album by American jazz saxophonist Lee Konitz originally released on the Choice label in 1978 and rereleased by Candid on CD in 1996 with two bonus tracks.

Critical reception

Scott Yanow on Allmusic said "Konitz explores ten superior standards from the swing era plus a brief unaccompanied workout ... The relaxed, often lyrical, and slightly unpredictable interpretations are quite enjoyable".

Track listing 
 "I Remember You" (Victor Schertzinger, Johnny Mercer) - 6:33
 "Skylark" (Hoagy Carmichael, Mercer) - 3:35
 "Thanks for the Memory" (Ralph Rainger, Leo Robin) - 4:11
 "You Are Too Beautiful" (Richard Rodgers, Lorenz Hart) - 4:26
 "Handful of Stars" (Jack Lawrence, Ted Shapiro) - 5:20
 "Autumn Nocturne" (Josef Myrow, Kim Gannon) - 3:28
 "Tangerine" (Schertzinger, Mercer) - 3:54
 "Tenorlee/Oh, Lady Be Good!" (Lee Konitz/George Gershwin, Ira Gershwin) - 8:12
 "The Gypsy" (Billy Reid) - 3:22 Bonus track on CD reissue
 "'Tis Autumn" (Henry Nemo) - 3:58 Bonus track on CD reissue
Recorded at Macdonald Studio, NYC on January 7, 1977 (tracks 2, 4, 6 & 7), July 24, 1977 (tracks 1, 3 & 5) and March 23, 1978 (tracks 8-10)

Personnel 
 Lee Konitz – tenor saxophone
 Jimmy Rowles – piano
 Michael Moore – bass

References 

Lee Konitz albums
1978 albums
Candid Records albums